The 2005 Ole Miss Rebels football team represented the University of Mississippi during the 2005 NCAA Division I-A football season. They participated in the Southeastern Conference in the Western Division. The team played their home games at Vaught–Hemingway Stadium in Oxford, Mississippi. They were coached by head coach Ed Orgeron.

Schedule

Roster

References

Ole Miss
Ole Miss Rebels football seasons
Ole Miss Rebels football